Subhash Ranchoddas Modi (born 30 March 1946) is a Kenyan umpire. Modi has served as the Kenya Cricket Umpires and Scorers Association as chairman, secretary and treasurer, the organisation awarded him life membership for his services. He also played for Kenya in 1969.

He has officiated in the Commonwealth Games in Malaysia; ICC Trophy; as fourth umpire in the 1999 World Cup as well as the Champions Trophy in 2000 in full ODIs.
 
Modi's son Hitesh Modi has captained the Kenyan national cricket team. The pair are unique as the only father/son pair to appear as Player and umpire in the same One-day International against Bangladesh at Nairobi in August 2006; father gave son out lbw.

See also
 List of One Day International cricket umpires
 List of Twenty20 International cricket umpires

References

1946 births
Kenyan Hindus
Living people
Kenyan cricketers
Kenyan One Day International cricket umpires
Kenyan people of Gujarati descent
Kenyan people of Indian descent
Kenyan Twenty20 International cricket umpires